Paul Hector Pandian (27 February 1945 – 4 January 2020) was an Indian politician of the All India Anna Dravida Munnetra Kazhagam and Member of the Legislative Assembly of Tamil Nadu from Tirunelveli district. He served as the Speaker of the Tamil Nadu Legislative Assembly from 1985 to 1989. He served as Deputy Speaker and Speaker of Tamil Nadu Legislative Assembly from 21 June 1980 to 5 February 1989. He was one of the only two candidates elected to the Tamil Nadu Legislature from the V. N. Janaki Ramachandran Faction of AIADMK in 1989, when he won the Cheranmahadevi seat. He was elected to the Lok Sabha from Tirunelveli Parliamentary constituency in 1999. He was the organising secretary of the All India Anna Dravida Munnetra Kazhagam which was led by former Tamil Nadu Chief Minister Jayalalithaa.

His son, Paul Manoj Pandian, was also elected an MLA for AIADMK in 2001 from Cheranmahadevi, the same constituency represented by P. H. Pandian in 1989.

Pandian was one of the two senior AIADMK leaders who had not supported the ascension of Sasikala within the party after the death of Jayalalithaa in December 2016. Pandian further spoke out against Sasikala's chief ministerial candidacy in February 2017, asserting that she was unfit for the position. He also raised suspicions over Jayalalithaa's death claiming that she had died under unnatural circumstances.

Electoral performance

References

All India Anna Dravida Munnetra Kazhagam politicians
2020 deaths
Speakers of the Tamil Nadu Legislative Assembly
Lok Sabha members from Tamil Nadu
India MPs 1989–1991
People from Tirunelveli
Deputy Speakers of the Tamil Nadu Legislative Assembly
1945 births
India MPs 1999–2004
Tamil Nadu MLAs 1985–1989